Anantavaram is a neighbourhood and a part of Urban Notified Area of Amaravati, the state capital of the Indian state of Andhra Pradesh. It was a village in Thullur mandal of Guntur district, prior to its denotification as gram panchayat.

Geography 
The village is located at 16.5275°N 80.4681°E.

Religious worships 

Ananthavaram has a historical temple Anathavaram Venkateswara Swamy Temple dedicated to Lord Venkateswara, situated on the hill top. It is being administered by Tirumala Tirupati Devasthanams trust.

Transport 
Ananthavaram lies on Guntur-Thulluru road. APS RTC operates bus services from GunturMangalagiri, Thulluru and Amaravathi to this region.

References 

Neighbourhoods in Amaravati